Hector was a Trojan prince, champion of Troy and one of the greatest fighters of the Trojan War from Greek mythology.

Hector may also refer to:

People 

 Hector (given name), origin of the given name and list of people with the name
 Hector (surname), origin of the surname and list of people with the surname
 Hector (DJ) (born 1980), Mexican DJ and producer
 Hector (musician) (born 1947), Finnish musician
 Hector Ó hEochagáin (born 1969), Irish television presenter, commonly known as simply "Hector"

Places

Antarctica
 Mount Hector (Antarctica)

Australia 

 Hector, Queensland, a town in the Mackay Region, Australia

Canada
 Hector Glacier, Alberta
 Hector Lake, Alberta
 Mount Hector (Alberta)

New Zealand
 Hector, New Zealand, a settlement
 Hector River
 Mount Hector (New Zealand)

United States
 Hector, Arkansas, a town
 Hector, in San Bernardino County, California, where the rare clay mineral hectorite was found
 Hector, Kentucky, Clay County, Kentucky
 Hector, Minnesota, a city
 Hector, New York, a town
 Hector, Ohio
 Hector International Airport, North Dakota
 Hector Township, Potter County, Pennsylvania

Arts, entertainment, and media

Films
 Hector (1987 film), a Flemish comedy film
 Hector (2015 film), a British drama film

Other arts, entertainment, and media
 Hector, the mascot for the heavy metal band HammerFall
 Hector, a Cherokee vigilante and, after his death, a symbol of "Hector Lives" justice for reservation residents in Longmire
 Hector: Badge of Carnage, a trilogy of computer games
 Hector, the eponymous dog in Hector's House

Science and computing 
 624 Hektor, a Trojan asteroid
 Hector (API), a Java Cassandra client
 HECToR, 'a Research Councils UK High End Computing Service' - the UK's national academic supercomputer

Meteorology 
 Hector (cloud), a named cumulonimbus cloud that forms consistently over the Tiwi Islands, Australia

Transportation and craft

Ships 
 Hector (ship), the vessel that carried the first Scottish immigrants to Nova Scotia in 1773
 Hector (1809 ship), a West Indiaman, captured and burnt 1814
 Hector (steamboat 1897), a fishing and tug boat
 Hector class ship of the line, a French Navy class
 French ship Hector (1756), lead ship of the class
 Hector-class ironclad, a pair of Royal Navy armoured frigates built in the 1860s
 , ten ships of the Royal Navy
 , a diesel-powered tugboat
 , a repair ship that served with the United States Navy from 1944 to 1987

Other transportation and craft
 Hector, a steam locomotive of the South Devon Railway Eagle class
 Hawker Hector, British 1930s military aircraft
MG Hector, a sport utility vehicle sold by SAIC Motor in India

See also 
 Hectors River, Jamaica
 Hektor (disambiguation)
 Hurricane Hector, a list of tropical cyclones in the Eastern Pacific Ocean